was a Japanese idol girl group associated with Hello! Project. The group was formed in August 2004 and consists of members Rika Ishikawa (Morning Musume), Erika Miyoshi, and Yui Okada, with Ishikawa being the leader. The group officially disbanded on June 29, 2008 after their last concert during their v-u-densetsu 5 tour.

Members 

 Rika Ishikawa
 Erika Miyoshi
 Yui Okada

Legacy

In 2009, V-U-den was revived as a Hello! Project Shuffle Unit under the name . The new line-up consisted of Morning Musume members Sayumi Michishige and Jun Jun; Berryz Kobo member and Risako Sugaya. The group released songs for Hello! Project's compilation album Champloo 1: Happy Marriage Song Cover Shū. They also performed as a concert-only unit until 2011. In 2013, Zoku V-U-den reappeared with Rika Ishikawa to perform "Koisuru Angel Heart".

Discography

Albums (first generation)

Singles (first generation) 

* Though the romanization of this song would imply the translation would be "Ice Cream and My Pudding", "Aisu" is written with the kanji "Ai (愛)" for "love", thus making it "Love Cream and My Pudding".  Also, in the PV for the song, there is a two-second screen that translates it as "Ice Cream and My Pudding", therefore it is a play on words.

Singles (second generation)

"ONLY YOU" is released on the compilation "Champloo 1 ~Happy Marriage Song Cover Shuu~ (チャンプル1 ~ハッピーマリッジソングカバー集~)

DVDs

References

External links 
 Official Hello! Project profile
v-u-den discography at Up-Front Works

Japanese girl groups
Japanese idol groups
Japanese pop music groups
Musical groups established in 2004
Hello! Project groups
Musical groups from Tokyo